An "I quit" match is a type of professional wrestling submission match in which the only way to win is to make the opponent say the words "I quit" (usually into a microphone). It is a variation of the submission match as it can only be won by submission, but it is special in that the submission has to take the form of the forfeiting opponent saying "I quit". Generally, whenever a wrestler knocks down their opponent with a move or inflicts a submission move, the opponent will be asked—either by the referee or the opponent—to say the words into a microphone. "I quit" matches are commonly used to settle (kayfabe) grudges and embarrass rivals since saying "I quit" is usually a sign of admitted inferiority.

History 
The first "I quit" match was in the National Wrestling Alliance (NWA)/Jim Crockett Promotions at Starrcade on November 28, 1985. Magnum T. A. defeated Tully Blanchard in a match (with a cage around the ring) for Blanchard's NWA United States Heavyweight Championship. Near the end of that match, Magnum used a piece of wood with a nail in it to pierce Blanchard's forehead. At that point, Blanchard screamed "Yes! Yes!" into the microphone, indicating that he was quitting the match and Magnum won the championship.

One of the most famous "I quit" matches took place on January 24, 1999, at the Royal Rumble between The Rock and Mick Foley (as Mankind) in the World Wrestling Federation (WWF, now WWE) for the WWF Championship. The match lasted just over 20 minutes, ending after Foley took eleven unprotected chair shots to the head while his hands were handcuffed behind his back. The Rock eventually won the match, but it was later revealed that Foley was completely unconscious and The Rock had played a tape of Foley saying "I quit" over the public address system. The following night on Raw, The Rock's "I quit!" match against Triple H ended when Triple H was extorted into saying "I quit" because Kane was about to chokeslam Chyna. John Cena retained his WWE Championship by defeating John "Bradshaw" Layfield (JBL) in an "I quit" match at Judgment Day on May 22, 2005. At Breaking Point on September 13, 2009, Cena defeated his long time rival Randy Orton in an "I quit" match to win the WWE Championship, forcing Orton to say "I quit" while he was handcuffed and Cena simultaneously had applied his submission hold, the STF.

"I quit" matches involving women have been rare. At No Mercy on October 19, 2003, there was an intergender match between WWE chairman Vince McMahon and his daughter Stephanie partly under "I quit" rules. However, the match was decided when Stephanie's mother Linda threw in the towel for her daughter, giving Vince the victory. The first "I quit" match between WWE Divas was contested at One Night Stand on June 1, 2008, when Beth Phoenix defeated Melina.

On the May 14, 2009 episode of Impact, Total Nonstop Action Wrestling (TNA), now known as Impact Wrestling, put on its first "I quit" match, where Booker T defeated Jethro Holiday after an axe kick. TNA had another "I quit" match on May 24, 2009, where A.J. Styles defeated Booker T to retain the TNA Legends Championship after Jenna Morasca threw a towel into the ring for Booker T.

On the May 4, 2016 episode of Lucha Underground, Sexy Star defeated Mariposa in the promotion's first "I quit" match, known in Spanish as a "no mas" ("no more") match.

An "I respect you" match is a variation of the "I quit" match as to win a wrestler must make their opponent say the words "I respect you". The first "I respect you" match was held in World Championship Wrestling (WCW) at SuperBrawl VI on February 11, 1996, and pitted Brian Pillman and Kevin Sullivan. At the end of the match, Pillman lost by saying "I respect you, bookerman!". In doing so, Pillman broke kayfabe as Sullivan was also WCW booker at the time.

One January 17, 2017 episode of WWE 205 Live, Gentleman Jack Gallagher defeated Ariya Daivari in a variation of the "I quit" match called the "I forfeit" match by forcing Daivari to say "I forfeit".

Matches

All Elite Wrestling

Extreme Championship Wrestling

Lucha Underground 
In the promotion, "I quit" matches are billed as a "No Más Match," with the submission phrase was made in Spanish ("No más").

Ring of Honor

Total Nonstop Action Wrestling/Impact Wrestling

World Championship Wrestling

World Wrestling Federation/Entertainment

References 

Professional wrestling match types